The China Democratic Socialist Party (CDSP) was a Chinese political party founded in Shanghai on 14 August 1946. It was formed through the merger of the former Chinese National Socialist Party and the Democratic Constitutionalist Party. The inaugural leader of the party was Carsun Chang. Along with the Kuomintang, the Young China Party and China Democratic League, it was one of the longest active political parties in both Nationalist China and in post-civil war rump Republic of China in Taiwan.

Ideology 
The CDSP's platform was to promote democratic socialism in China, world peace, individual freedoms, economic development, a narrowing of the gap between rich and poor, and equal rights for women.  The party also sought the implementation of a social welfare system for public health and social security.

History 
Both the Socialists and the Democratic Constitutionalists had strong ties to Liang Qichao's defunct Progressive Party. The former were based in China as part of the China Democratic League while the latter was made up of overseas Chinese and expatriates.  Most of their members were middle-age to elderly.  They never actively recruited and most of their members were friends or relatives of each other.  Their small numbers meant they lacked influence but also allowed them to operate under the radar of the Kuomintang and prevent infiltration by other parties.

After the promulgation of the Republic of China's constitution in January 1947, the CDSP established branches in several provinces and cities around China and participated in the first elections to the National Assembly, Legislative Yuan and Control Yuan.  The party also postulated Hsu Fu-lin as candidate for vice-president in the First National Assembly of 1948 in Nanking.

After the ROC Government's retreat from mainland China, key members, including elected representatives and party leaders, followed the Kuomintang to Taiwan. Carsun Chang moved to the United States and was replaced as party head by Hsu Fu-lin until Hsu's death in 1958. Chang was elected party chairman by a national congress of the CDSP held in 1959.

The CDSP, along with the Young China Party, was one of two authorized opposition parties in the Republic of China during the imposition of Martial Law by ruling Kuomintang. The party held a small number of seats in the National Assembly, Legislative Yuan and Control Yuan, regarded as having little influence. The party failed to gain elected representation after Taiwan's democratic transition in the 1990s.

On 29 April 2020, the party was disbanded by the Ministry of the Interior due to a failure to re-register after changes in the law regarding political parties.

Electoral performances 
The party did not contest in elections after 1992.

Presidential elections

Legislative elections

National Assembly elections

References 

1946 establishments in China
2020 disestablishments in China
Defunct political parties in Taiwan
Defunct political parties in China
Democratic socialism in China
Democratic socialist parties in Asia
Political parties established in 1946
Political parties in the Republic of China
Political parties with year of disestablishment missing
Socialist parties in China
Socialist parties in Taiwan